This is a demography of Myanmar (also known as Burma) including statistics such as population, ethnicity, language, education level and religious affiliations.

Population

1983 census

At the time of the 1983 census in Burma, as of 31 March 1983, the population was 35,442,972. , this was estimated by the CIA World Factbook to have increased to 60,584,650. Other estimates put place the total population at around 60 million. China's People's Daily reported that Burma had a census in 2007, and at the end of 2009 has 59.2 million people, and growing at 2% annually. with exception for Cyclone Nargis in 2008. Most of these estimates have indeed overlooked the demographic changes that were at work since the 1970s in the country.

Britain-based human rights agencies place the population as high as 70 million. Estimates for the country explicitly take into account the effects of excess mortality due to AIDS. This can result in lower life expectancy, higher infant mortality and death rates, lower population and growth rates, and changes in the distribution of population by age and sex than would otherwise be expected.

No trustworthy census has occurred since the 1930s. In the 1940s, the detailed census results were destroyed during the Japanese invasion of 1942. Census results after that time have been flawed by civil wars and a series of military governments. The census in 1983 occurred at a time when parts of the country were controlled by insurgent groups and inaccessible to the government.

2014 census

The Provisional results of the 2014 census show that the total population of Myanmar is 51,419,420—a population well below the official estimates of more than 60 million. This total population includes 50,213,067 persons counted during the census and an estimated 1,206,353 persons in parts of northern Rakhine State, Kachin State and Kayin State who were not counted. More females (51.8%) were counted than males (48.2%). People who were out of the country at the time of the census are not included in these figures.

The provisional census results indicated that there were 10,889,348 households in Myanmar. On average, 4.4 people lived in each household in the country. The average household size was highest in Kachin State and Chin State at 5.1. The lowest household sizes were observed in Ayeyawady Region, Bago Region, Magway Region and Naypyidaw Union Territory, each at 4.1.

Vital statistics

Burma has a low fertility rate (2.23 in 2011), slightly above replacement level, especially as compared to other Southeast Asian countries of similar economic standing, like Cambodia (3.18) and Laos (4.41), representing a significant decline from 4.7 in 1983 to 2.4 in 2001, despite the absence of any national population policy.

The fertility rate is much pronouncedly lower in urban areas. This is attributed to extreme delays in marriage (almost unparalleled in the region, with the exception of developed countries), the prevalence of illegal abortions, and the high proportion of single, unmarried women of reproductive age (with 25.9% of women aged 30–34 and 33.1% of men and women aged 25–34 single).

These patterns stem from several cultural and economic dynamics. The first is economic hardship, which results in the delay of marriage and family-building (the average age of marriage in Burma is 27.5 for men, 26.4 for women). The second is the social acceptability of celibacy among the Burmese, who are predominantly Buddhist and value celibacy as a means of spiritual development.

Births and deaths

Fertility and births

Total Fertility Rate (TFR) (Wanted Fertility Rate) and Crude Birth Rate (CBR):

Crude Birth Rate (CBR), Total Fertility Rate (TFR), and Total Marital Fertility Rate (TMFR) by region (2014 Myanmar Population and Housing Census):

Structure of the population

Life expectancy 

Source: UN World Population Prospects

Ethnic groups

Government classifications 
The Burmese government identifies eight major national ethnic races (which comprise 135 "distinct" ethnic groups), which include the Burman (58%), Shan (10%), Karen (7%), Rakhine (4%), Mon (3%), Kayah (1.5%), and Kachin (1.3%). However, the government classification system is flawed, because it groups ethnic groups by geography, rather than by linguistic or genetic similarity (e.g. the Kokang are under the Shan ethnicity, although they are a Han-Chinese sub-group).

Unrecognised ethnic groups include Burmese Han-Chinese and Burmese Indians, who form 3% and 2% of the population respectively. The remaining 5% of the population belong to small ethnic groups such as the remnants of the Anglo-Burmese and Anglo-Indian communities, as well as the Lisu, Rawang, Naga, Padaung, Burmese Gurkha, Moken, and many minorities across Shan State.

Language

The official language and primary medium of instruction of Burma is Burmese (65%). Multiple languages are spoken in Burma, that includes Shan (7.4%), Karen (6.2%), Hindi or Urdu (4.3%), Kachin (2.1%), Chinese (2%) Chin (1.6%), Bengali (1.3%), Mon (1.8%), and Rakhine (2%), Nepali (1%). Additionally English is spoken as a second language, particularly by the educated urban elite, and is the secondary language learnt in government schools. In recent years, instruction of the Chinese language has been recovered, after long-term limitations from the government of Myanmar.

Religious affiliation

Buddhist Sangha 
Below are statistics regarding the Buddhist monastic community in Myanmar, compiled by the State Sangha Maha Nayaka Committee.

CIA World Factbook demographic statistics 

The following demographic statistics are from the CIA World Factbook, unless otherwise indicated.

Age structure
 0–14 years: 26.85% (male 7,567,976/female 7,233,577)
15-24 years: 17.75% (male 4,917,290/female 4,865,264)
25-54 years: 42.36% (male 11,426,913/female 11,922,728)
 55-64 years: 7.52% (male 1,930,253/female 2,213,263)
 65 years and over: 5.53% (male 1,327,811/female 1,718,739) (2017 est.)

Median age
 total: 28.2 years (2017 est.)

Population growth rate
0.91% (2017 est.)

Urbanisation

 urban population: 29.6% of total population (2014 census)
 rate of urbanisation: 2.9% of annual rate of change (2010–15 est.)

Human sex ratios
 at birth: 1.06 males/female
 under 15 years: 1.03 males/female
 15–64 years: 0.98 male/female
 65 years and over: 0.75 male/female (2009 est.)
 total population: 0.93 male/female (2014 census)

Life expectancy 

total population: 69.92 years
male: 68.27 years
female: 71.67 years (2022 est.)

Obesity - adult prevalence rate 

5.8% (2016)

Children under the age of 5 years underweight 

18.9% (2016)

Literacy
(age 15 and over can read and write, official statistics)
 Total: 89.5%
 Male: 92.6%
 Female: 86.9%

Education expenditures
0.8% of GDP (2011)

Notes

References

 Population Projections for Myanmar, 1983-2013 Asia Pacific Population Journal, Vol. 6, No. 2 (PDF document)